Bernard John Marsden (born 7 May 1951) is an English rock and blues guitarist. He is primarily known for his work with Whitesnake, having written or co-written with David Coverdale many of the group's hit songs, such as "Fool for Your Loving", "Walking in the Shadow of the Blues", "She's A Woman", "Lovehunter", "Trouble", "Child of Babylon", "Rough and Ready", and the multi-million selling chart-topper "Here I Go Again".

Early career 
After playing with local Buckingham based groups, Marsden formed Skinny Cat at the age of 17.

Marsden got his first professional gig with UFO in 1972. He next played with Glenn Cornick's Wild Turkey in 1973, before he joined drummer Cozy Powell's band Cozy Powell's Hammer. He then joined Babe Ruth in 1975, and played on two releases for Capitol Records, Stealin' Home (1975) and Kid's Stuff (1976). During his time with Babe Ruth, Cozy Powell recommended him to Jon Lord, who was forming a post Deep Purple band with Ian Paice, Paice Ashton Lord, in 1976, with Tony Ashton .

During his time recording the Malice in Wonderland album with Paice Ashton Lord, Marsden worked alongside saxophonist Howie Casey who recommended Marsden join Paul McCartney's Wings, but the position never materialised, as Whitesnake was being formed at the same time period.

Paice Ashton Lord
Paice Ashton Lord was the band formed by Jon Lord and Ian Paice after the demise of Deep Purple.  Long-time associate and keyboard player Tony Ashton made up the third part. Cozy Powell recommended Marsden, who auditioned alongside bassist Paul Martinez. There was much anticipation for the band, but after one album and only five gigs, the band folded during sessions in Munich for a second album, momentous because it was in Munich that Marsden met David Coverdale for the first time.

Whitesnake
After Paice Ashton Lord folded, in 1978, Marsden formed a new band with former Deep Purple vocalist David Coverdale and guitarist Micky Moody. The band started as David Coverdale's Whitesnake, which then became Whitesnake. Marsden played on the first EP, first five albums and a live album: Snakebite (1978), Trouble (1978), Lovehunter (1979), Ready & Willing (1980), Live In The Heart Of The City (1980), Come An' Get It (1981) and Saints & Sinners (1982), contributing many of the songs with David Coverdale and sometimes Moody.  Marsden and Coverdale went on to create Whitesnake's anthem "Here I Go Again" in 1982, a song that sold many millions all over the world.  Both writers have received many awards for the song. As of 2018, the song has been counted at six million US radio plays.

Post-Whitesnake bands
Following his departure from Whitesnake, Marsden formed a short-lived band called Bernie Marsden's SOS.  Not long after, Bernie Marsden formed the band Alaska with Robert Hawthorne on vocals and Richard Bailey on keyboards. Alaska released two melodic rock albums in two years, Heart of the Storm (1984) and The Pack (1985), before splitting. In 1986, he put together MGM with former Whitesnake members Neil Murray and his replacement guitarist in Whitesnake Mel Galley. The band, briefly, also included former Toto vocalist, Bobby Kimball.  Recordings were made but still remain unreleased.

In 1989, Marsden reunited with Whitesnake guitarist Moody to form The Moody Marsden band, recording an acoustic live album in Norway called Live In Hell and an electric live album recorded in England Never Turn Our Back On The Blues, that featured Zak Starkey on drums. Marsden & Moody toured throughout Europe and recorded one studio album called Real Faith in 1994, and years later contacted the Norwegian vocalist Jørn Lande to form a new band called "The Snakes" compromised on only play songs from their time in Whitesnake, releasing a studio abum (Once Bitten) and a live record (Live in Europe) both in the same year of 1998. Following the departure of Lande, bassist Sid Ringsby and drummer Willy Bendiksen, the band shifted its name to The Company Of Snakes, welcoming keyboardist Don Airey, bassist Neil Murray, drummer John Lingwood and former Bad Company vocalist Robert Hart. As it turned out, the name was a little misleading as Robert Hart did not actually make the record with them. In 2002 the band released a double album of Whitesnake songs called Here They Go Again recorded at Sweden Rock Festival, and a year later produced a single studio album Burst The Bubble with Swedish vocalist Stefan Berggrenn. Eventually the band changed its name once again to "M3". This revamped line up included Marsden, Moody, Murray, Berggrenn, the drummer Jimmy Copley and keyboard player Mark Stanway.  M3 produced a triple-CD DVD called Rough 'n' Ready  which again features the songs from their Whitesnake's legacy, now with former Rainbow Doogie White as special guest sharing the vocal duties, and another live album "Classsic Snake Live Vol I" in 2006 with former Black Sabbath Tony Martin replacing Berggren and White. The band ended in the same year with Marden, Moody and Murray following in their separate ways.

Solo career
Marsden released two solo albums during his time in Whitesnake. First released in Japan on the Japanese label Trash/Trio in 1979, And About Time Too, became the number one import into the UK. EMI Records soon picked up the rights to the album and released it in Europe shortly before the release of Marsden's second solo album, Look At Me Now, in 1981. Both of these LPs were on the Parlophone label; at the time only Marsden and The Beatles were on the label. His BBC Friday Rock Show solo sessions were released on CD; these featured David Coverdale and Toto drummer Simon Phillips. No more solo albums appeared until the release of his Green and Blues in 1994. This album is his tribute to guitarists in the John Mayall & the Bluesbreakers allowing him to thank Eric Clapton, Peter Green, and Mick Taylor, but most of all John Mayall.

Marsden recorded two soundtrack CDs; his music has featured in many US TV shows.

He has produced his own documentary blues-based DVD, filmed in Mississippi.  Concentrating on the Clarksdale area, it features some wonderful stories and playing, especially with James 'Super Chikan' Johnson, Morgan Freeman appears, dancing in the Ground Zero Club in Clarksdale as Marsden plays with his band. His continuing fascination with blues music led to him producing USA artist Larry Johnson's Blues From Harlem CD, and forming close relationships with Honey Boy Edwards, John Jackson and Louisiana Red, playing with all of them as well.

Into the 2000s, he produced his Big Boy Blue double-CD, Stacks, featuring Jimmy Copley, Big Boy Blue Live, and Bernie Plays Rory, a double CD of Rory Gallagher's material.  A live acoustic recording, Going To My Hometown, was recorded at The Radcliffe Centre in Buckingham. Castle Communications released a definitive compilation double CD called Blues and Scales which features songs from almost all the bands of his career.

He played guitar with Elkie Brooks, a singer he long admired; with The Diesel Band with John Coghlan; worked at The National Theatre in two Shakespeare productions with Sir Nicholas Hytner; wrote for Joe Bonamassa; and played with Warren Haynes of the Allman Brothers Band; joining the band on stage at the Beacon Theatre in New York. A personal highlight of his long career was playing guitar in the Ringo Starr Band; with shows in Monaco and in the UK.

In 2021, Bernie Marsden teamed up with Conquest Music to release his next solo album, “Kings”, a tribute to the Blues giants, Albert King, Freddie King and BB King. “Kings” reached #18 in the UK album sales chart and was followed quickly by the release of “Chess”, inspired by the legendary Chicago based Chess label. 

2022 saw the next Bernie Marsden solo release, “Trios”.  Again on Conquest Music, as part of Bernie's Inspirations Series, Trios is Bernie’s homage to the great power trios that inspired and helped to shape his musical style and taste. The guitarists given the nod of approval in this set reads like a who’s who of fretboard royalty… Beck, Green, Walsh, Hendrix, Clapton, Trower, Gallagher and more.

With an added twist, the name of Marsden is added to this list as Bernie revisits a track he played on with the great Cozy Powell back in 1974, the foot stomping hit, Na, Na, Na.

Latest news 
His inaugural Guitar Mojo Experience was held at Arts at Stowe School in Buckinghamshire in 2018 and 2019. A third Mojo was scheduled for July 2020.

In 2015, the University of Buckingham granted Bernie Marsden an honorary Master of Arts degree.

In 2021, Bernie Marsden was crowned The Lord Of The Blues at the HRH Awards.

He continues to play solo shows, mainly festivals in Europe and the UK, joining Joe Bonamassa's Blues Cruises, and also took a show on the road playing the Whitesnake album Ready And Willing in its entirety in the autumn of 2019.

Guitar related 
PRS Guitars released a Bernie Marsden Signature Edition guitar, and Gibson Guitars made a limited edition number of his Gibson Les Paul guitar known as "The Beast".  His second book, released in 2018, is Tales of Tone and Volume and is a large tome featuring his guitar collection. Marsden contributed a column to Guitarist magazine in 2018–19

In 2014, Marsden was signed to the Dutch record label Mascot Provogue and released the critically acclaimed album, Shine. The album features David Coverdale singing the Whitesnake classic "Trouble", Joe Bonamassa on guitar on the title track "Shine", Don Airey on keys and both Ian Paice and Jimmy Copley on drums.

Marsden released his autobiography Where's My Guitar in 2017. The book was updated and reissued by HarperCollins in November 2019.

Discography

With UFO
 1973 The Dave Edmunds Rockfield Demos

With Cozy Powell's Hammer
 1974  Na Na Na/ Mistral ( RAK single) + BBC Radio Recordings

With Wild Turkey
 1974  BBC Radio Sessions
 2002  Rarest Turkey Audio Archive label
 2003 Rare Turkey BBC and rarities Audio Archive

With Babe Ruth on Capitol Records
 1975 Stealin' Home
 1976 Kid's Stuff

With Paice Ashton Lord on Oyster (UK) and Warner Brothers (US)
 1977 Malice in Wonderland
 1993 BBC Radio 1 Live in Concert '77
 2007 Live in London '77 (DVD)

With Whitesnake EMI/United Artists
 1978 Snakebite
 1978 Trouble
 1979 Lovehunter
 1980 Ready an' Willing
 1980 Live...in the Heart of the City
 1981 Come an' Get It
 1982 Saints & Sinners

With Alaska Bronze Records/ Castle
1984 – Heart of the Storm (as Bernie Marsden's Alaska)
1985 – The Pack
1986 – Alive (VHS, DVD – 2005)
2002 – Live Baked Alaska
2003 – Anthology 1

With The Moody Marsden Band
1992 – Never Turn Our Back on the Blues 
1994 – Live in Hell – Unplugged 
1994 – The Time Is Right for Live (the two above albums released as one)
1994 – Real Faith

With The Snakes, The Company of Snakes
1998 – Once Bitten (Japan only)
1998 – Live in Europe
2001 – Here They Go Again
2002 – Burst the Bubble
with M32005 – Classic Snake Live2005/2007 – Rough an' Ready (CD/DVD)
2007--       Rough An' Ready CD Castle

With The Little House Band
2000 Christmas 2000 (COS line up as The Little House Band) Unreleased Promo, Cover Versions
With The Majesticaires
2001 Solid Rock (COS line up as The Majesticaires) Unreleased Promo, Cover Versions

Solo recordings
1979 – And About Time Too!  (reissue: 2000)
1981 – Look at Me Now (reissue: 2000)
1992 – The Friday Rock Show Sessions '811995 – Tribute to Peter Green: Green and Blues2002 – Blues Rock (Bad Ass'd Boogie Driven Hot Licks) Industry Only Sampler
2003 – Big Boy Blue (Advance Edition)
2003 – Big Boy Blue (2CD Edition)
2005 – Live at the Granary2005 – Stacks2006 – Blues 'n' Scales: A Snakeman's Odyssey 1970–2004 (compilation)
2007 – Big Boy Blue... Live (live album)
2009 – Bernie Plays Rory2009 – Going to My Hometown (live acoustic album)
2010 - Remix of Bernie plays Rory2011 – Ballyshannon Blues 
2012 – Very Local Boy (compilation)
2013 – Jam with Bernie (Guitar Help)
2014 – Shine2015 – The Rory Gallagher Sessions 2 CD
2017 – Tales of Tone and Volume CD (Only with book)
2021 – Kings (Conquest Music)
2021 – Chess (Conquest Music)
2022 – Trios (Conquest Music)

Other recordings
1971  Speedy Keene Island LP
1973 You & Me Chrysalis LP (Chick Churchill)
1973  Matthew Fisher RCA LP
1974 Jumblequeen Chrysalis LP (Bridget St John)
1979 Over the Top (Cozy Powell)
1980 Why (K2)
1981 Tilt (Cozy Powell)
1982 Before I Forget (Jon Lord)
1982 Reading Rock '82 (VA)
1988 Guitar Speak 2 (VA)
1988 "South Africa" (Ian Gillan, songwriter)
1990 Perfect Crime (Blonde on Blonde, as producer only)
1991 Forcefield IV: Let the Wild Run Free (Forcefield)
1992 Instrumentals (Forcefield)
1994 Tellin' Stories (Walter Trout Band)
1994 Line Up (Borderline)
1995 Frankie – Soundtrack
1998 Still Crazy – Soundtrack
2000 Snakebites – The Music of Whitesnake (Tribute)
2000 Popmodel (Mama's Jasje)
2002 Blues for Harlem (Larry Johnson)
2002 I Eat Them for Breakfast (Micky Moody)
2003 Freak Out! (Chris Catena)
2007 Booze, Brawds and Rockin' Hard (Chris Catena)
2007 Human Spirit (Gary Fletcher)
2007 Ian Paice and Friends Live in Reading 2006 (DVD)
2007 Little Hard Blues (Andrea Ranfagni, "Everybody Knows", "May Day", "New Baby", "Easy Woman")
2008 The Original – The Audiolab Sessions 2002 (Les Castle)
2008 Slap My Hand (Jimmy Copley)
2009 Endangered Species – Live at Abbey Road 2000 (CD/DVD, Tony Ashton & Friends)
2011 All Out (Don Airey)
2014 Where Blues Meets Rock ("Linin'" Track)
2014 Silver Rails (Jack Bruce)
2014 Celebrating Jon Lord (VA)
2016  'Cream Revisited (VA) Audio and DVD

Film and television appearances
1989 Runaway Dreams (musical director)
1989  'The Paradise Club' BBC Television
1995 Rock Family Trees (interviewee)
1995 Frankie – Liebe, Laster, Rock ’n’ Roll (German youth series as piano player Big Ed)
1998 Still Crazy (performer, song "A Woman Like That")
2006 Heavy Metal – Louder Than Life (interviewee)
2013 Dance with the Devil: The Cozy Powell Story (interviewee)
2013 A Day in the Delta (host)
2014 Play It Loud: The Story of Marshall (interviewee)

References

External links
 
 Tales of Tone and Volume

1951 births
Living people
People from Buckingham
English rock singers
English rock guitarists
English blues guitarists
English male guitarists
English heavy metal guitarists
Lead guitarists
UFO (band) members
Whitesnake members
Paice Ashton Lord members
The Snakes (band) members
Provogue Records artists
The Company of Snakes members